Cady may refer to:

Places

United States
 Cady, Wisconsin, a town
 Cady Mountains, California
 Cady Pond, Massachusetts
 Cady Lake, South Dakota
 Camp Cady, California, a United States Army camp in 1860–1861 and 1866–1871

Elsewhere
 Cady, County Fermanagh, a townland in Magheraculmoney parish, County Fermanagh, Northern Ireland
 Cady (river), France
 Cady Nunatak, Marie Byrd Land, Antarctica

People
 Cady (given name)
 Cady (surname)

Fictional characters
 Max Cady, the villain of John D. MacDonald's novel The Executioners and two film adaptations, both titled Cape Fear
 Cady Heron, protagonist of the 2004 film Mean Girls, played by Lindsay Lohan
 Cady Longmire, daughter of the fictional Sheriff Walt Longmire in a series of mystery novels

See also

Caddy (disambiguation)
 Cadi (disambiguation)
 Kady